Charles Edward Jackson (born March 12, 1962) is a former American football safety in the National Football League for the Washington Redskins as a replacement player during the 1987 season.  He played college football for the Texas Tech Red Raiders

1962 births
Living people
Players of American football from Georgia (U.S. state)
American football safeties
Washington Redskins players
Texas Tech Red Raiders football players
People from Fort Gaines, Georgia